Bardhamanbhukti  was an ancient and medieval region/ territory spread across what are now Purba Bardhaman, Paschim Bardhaman and Bankura districts in the Indian state of West Bengal.

Ancient Rarh region was divided into several smaller regions – Kankagrambhukti, Bardhamanbhukti and Dandabhukti, as part of the Gupta Empire. The area was bound by three rivers – Ajay, Dwarakeswar and Hooghly. To the east there were forests.

References

Bankura district
Purba Bardhaman district
Paschim Bardhaman district
Ancient divisions in Bengal